Adventures of Rusty is a 1945 drama film, the first in the "Rusty" series of children's films. The series of eight films were made in the 1940s by Columbia Pictures with stories centered on Rusty, a German Shepherd dog. The film is notable for featuring the famous Ace the Wonder Dog as Rusty, the only appearance by Ace in the Rusty films. It was directed by Paul Burnford.

Plot
Danny Mitchell (Ted Donaldson), a young boy in the American town of Lawtonville, is grieving over the loss of his dog. He is also struggling to adjust to his new stepmother, Ann (Margaret Lindsay), and has a difficult relationship with his father (Conrad Nagel) - causing him to call on Dr. Banning, a psychiatrist (Addison Richards) for assistance. However, Danny befriends Rusty, a ferocious German shepherd who was brought to the United States from Germany during World War II. Having worked a police dog for the Gestapo, however, Rusty is ill-tempered and Danny struggles to train him.

A subplot involves two Nazi saboteurs (Arno Frey and Eddie Parker) who arrive in Lawtonville, attempting to evade the Coast Guard and blow up an installation. They ultimately try to take Rusty by speaking to him in German.

Cast

 Ted Donaldson as Danny Mitchell
 Margaret Lindsay as Ann Mitchell
 Conrad Nagel as Hugh Mitchell
 Gloria Holden as Louise Hover
 Robert Williams as Will Nelson
 Addison Richards as Dr. Banning, Psychiatrist
 Arno Frey as Tausig
 Eddie Parker as Ehrlich
 Ace the Wonder Dog as Rusty
 Terry as Skipper

Cast notes
The dog portraying Rusty would change over the course of the series, with Flame having the most appearances as the character. Danny's parents would also be portrayed by different actors in almost every installment.

See also
 For the Love of Rusty 
 Rusty (film series)

References

External links
 
 
 
 

1945 drama films
1945 films
American drama films
American black-and-white films
Columbia Pictures films
Films about dogs
Films with screenplays by Aubrey Wisberg
Rusty (film series)
1940s English-language films
1940s American films